Ralph Hermann  (February 9, 1914 – July 28, 1994) was an American composer and conductor. He also used the pseudonym Richard Hale. Hermann worked as head of the music department of the American Broadcasting Company (ABC) since 1952 until his retirement in 1971.

Life
Hermann was born in Milwaukee, Wisconsin, and graduated from South Division High School. While in high school, he was awarded the Milwaukee Civic Music Medal for his outstanding musical commitment. He studied at the  Juilliard School of Music under Vittorio Giannini. His career began at his high school, where he composed, among other music, Kiddie Revue and played in several local bands, eventually playing under national band leaders including Freddy Martin and Jimmy Dorsey. In 1940 he started working for WTMJ as an arranger; when he left for World War II military service in 1943, he had a Sunday morning show of his own. During his military service he worked in interrogation and organized an orchestra of German prisoners that played to American troops and displaced persons in France; he later organized a symphony orchestra in Wiesbaden.

On his return to the US, Paul Whiteman hired him and recommended him to NBC in 1945. In 1952 he moved to ABC, where Hermann worked as head of the music department until his retirement in 1971.

Beginning in 1954 he also wrote works for symphonic band, and works for soloists such as Al Gallodoro (saxophone and clarinet) and Eugene Rousseau (saxophone). His adaptations of well-known classical works for concert band are still programmed regularly, such as  Porgy and Bess Medley  for saxophone and band,  Ellington Fantasy  Rossini's  Introduction, Theme, and Variations  and  Tosca Fantasy  for saxophone and band. He won an Emmy Award in 1963 for his Symphony No. 3—From the Scriptures.

Ralph Hermann was married and had three children. He died at home in Manhasset, New York, after an illness following a stroke.

Compositions
Works for orchestra
  Concerto for Doubles , for bass clarinet and orchestra
  Jewish Melodies  for clarinet and orchestra
Works for wind band
  Arlinton Overture 
  Belmont Overture 
  Circus Time 
  Clarinet Cake 
  Concerto for Horn,  for horn and band
  Fight Song  (Fight for UWM) 1965
  International Airport 
  Kiddie Ballet 
 Overture
 Baby Baptism
 Strolling the Baby Stroller
 Lullaby for a Naughty Girl
 Cops and Robbers
 Nightmare and Finale
  Little Suite No. 1 
  North Sea Overture 
  Percussion Discussion 
  Prelude and Caprice 
  Pulchinello , for bass clarinet and wind band
  Sleighride Express 
  Star Journey 
  Straw Flower,  concerto for alto saxophone and wind band
 Winter Bells
  Yellow Rose Of Texas 
Works for choir
  Christmas Fantasy , for mixed choir and brass
Chamber music
  Clarinet on the Town , for clarinet and piano
  Concertino for saxophone-Quartet 
Film music
 1960  Directions  television series

References

Bibliography 
 Wolfgang Suppan, Armin Suppan,  Das Neue Lexikon des Blasmusikwesens , 4. Auflage, Freiburg-Tiengen, Blasmusik Schulz Verlag GmbH, 1994, 
 Paul E. Bierley, William H. Rehrig:  The heritage encyclopedia of band music: composers and Their music , Westerville, Ohio: Integrity Press, 1991, 
 Jaques Cattell Press:  ASCAP biographical dictionary of composers, authors and publishers , Fourth Edition, New York: RR Bowker, 1980, 589 p, .
 Jean-Marie Londeix:  Musique pour saxophone, Volume II: répertoire général des oeuvres et des ouvrages d'enseignement pour le saxophone  Cherry Hill: Roncorp Publications, 1985
 Norman E. Smith:  Band musicnotes , Revised Edition, San Diego, California: Niel A. Kjos, Jr., 1979, 

1914 births
1994 deaths
American male composers
South Division High School alumni
Musicians from Milwaukee
20th-century American male musicians